Sir Edward Arthur Henry Blunt, ICS (14 March 1877–29 May 1941), was a British civil servant in India during the British Raj and a scholarly writer.

Early life
Blunt was born in Curepipe, Mauritius on 14 March 1877, the son of Frances Theophilus Blunt, who later became the colonial Commissioner of the Seychelles. His younger brother was Alfred Walter Frank Blunt, an Anglican bishop. Blunt studied at Marlborough College, and then at Corpus Christi College, Oxford and University College London. He passed at the top of the list for the Indian Civil Service competitive examination after his fourth year at Oxford. He was one year at University College London, and proceeded to India to join the Indian Civil Service in 1901.

Career 
Blunt was appointed to the United Provinces, with his first service as Assistant Commissioner, Lucknow, and afterwards at Rae Bareli in the same capacity before officiating as Deputy Commissioner for a brief period. In 1904 he was transferred to Benares as Joint Magistrate. In 1905 he joined the Secretariat, having been appointed Under-Secretary in the Judicial Department. From 1910 to 1912 he served as Superintendent Census Operations for the 1911 Census of India and from 1918 to 1919 as Director of Civil Supplies in Cawnpore. Then he was Financial Secretary to Government in the United Provinces for eleven years (1920–1931). From 1931 to 1935 he served as a Member of the Executive Council of the Governor of the United Provinces, before he stepped down due to poor health. 

In the 1919 Birthday Honours he was made an Officer of the Most Excellent Order of the British Empire (OBE), in the 1922 New Year Honours a Companion of the Order of the Indian Empire (CIE) and in 1934 Birthday Honours a Knight Commander of the Order of the Indian Empire (KCIE).

Later life and Death 
After Blunt's retirement, he returned to England, where he spent the last few years of his life in Fleet. Blunt died on 29 May 1941, and is buried in Fleet Cemetery.

Publications

References

This article incorporates text from The Cyclopedia of India: biographical, historical, administrative, commercial, Volume 1. The Cyclopedia Publishing Co., 1907

External links

Indian Civil Service (British India) officers
1877 births
1941 deaths
Historians of India
British Mauritius people
People educated at Marlborough College
Alumni of Corpus Christi College, Oxford
British people in colonial India
Writers in British India